Roberta (minor planet designation: 335 Roberta) is a large main belt asteroid. It was discovered on 1 September 1892, by German astronomer Anton Staus at Heidelberg Observatory. Roberta was the 12th asteroid that was discovered using photography, and the only asteroid discovery made by Staus.

Photometric observations of this asteroid from multiple sites during 2007 gave a light curve with a period of 12.054 ± 0.003 hours and a brightness variation of 0.13 ± 0.02 in magnitude. This agrees with a result reported in 1992, but differs from period estimates of 8.03 hours and 4.349 reported in 1987 and 2001, respectively.

Under the SMASS classification taxonomy, this asteroid is listed as a B-type; a group that combines both the Tholen B and F types. The spectrum of this object suggests the presence of magnetite (Fe3O4), which gives it the spectrally-blue coloration that is a characteristic of this SMASS class. The spectrum of this asteroid also displays a band feature near 2.9 μm that indicate the presence of a hydrated mineral. This suggests that the asteroid has undergone significant water-based alteration.

335 Roberta was identified as one of three asteroids that were likely to be a parent body for chondrites along with 449 Hamburga and 304 Olga. All three asteroids were known to have low-albedo (not reflect as much light) and be close to "meteorite producing resonances". Chrondrites are the most common type of meteor found on Earth, accounting for over 80% of all meteors. They are named for the tiny spherical silicate particles that are found inside them (those particles are called chondrules).

References

External links 
 Lightcurve plot of 335 Roberta, Palmer Divide Observatory, B. D. Warner (2007)
 Asteroid Lightcurve Database (LCDB), query form (info )
 Dictionary of Minor Planet Names, Google books
 Asteroids and comets rotation curves, CdR – Observatoire de Genève, Raoul Behrend
 Discovery Circumstances: Numbered Minor Planets (1)-(5000) – Minor Planet Center
 
 

000335
Discoveries by Anton Staus
Named minor planets
000335
000335
18920901